Back In Time is the debut album by American recording artist Judith Hill. Co-produced with Prince and recorded at Paisley Park, the album was released first as a free limited promotional download on March 23, 2015, and later to other streaming services. The CD was released on October 23, 2015 by NPG Records.

Background
After seeing a video clip of Grammy Award winner Hill telling a European TV show that she wanted to work with Prince, the musician and producer tracked Hill down and invited her to a listening party in Los Angeles for Prince's then-new album Art Official Age. That was the first time the two musicians had met, and Prince asked Hill to send him some of her songs. He provided her with some comments and Hill was later invited to Prince's Paisley Park studio complex to jam with his band. Hill had already written some of the songs for the album, and Prince suggested some new arrangements, which worked better for a band. The songs were recorded in two or three weeks, which Prince said was "the fastest album" he had ever produced.

Track listing

Credits 

 Art Direction, Design – Annie Madison
 Bass – Andrew Gouche, Robert Lee Hill (track 3)
 Booking – Gayle Holcomb
 Co-producer, Drum Programming – Trooko (track 3)
 Co-producer, Programmed By – Joshua Welton (tracks 3, 11)
 Drums – John Blackwell, Kirk Johnson
 Horns – NPG Hornz
 Keyboards – Dominique "Xavier" Taplin
 Management – John Welch
 Mixed By, Mastered By – Joshua Welton
 Musical Assistance – Joshua Welton
 Orchestra [Arranged by] – Michael Nelson
 Photography By – Randee St. Nicholas
 Producer – Judith Hill, Prince
 Public Relations – Bobbie Gale
 Recorded By – Booker T
 Strings (arrangement) – Judith Hill (track 3)
 Vocals, Guitar, Bass, Drums – Prince
 Vocals, Piano – Judith Hill

References

External links 
 
 
 Judith Hill's official website

2015 albums
Albums produced by Prince (musician)
NPG Records albums